Kasha Govind Patel (born July 18, 1991) is an American science writer, stand-up comedian, voice artist, and podcaster. She currently works as the deputy weather editor for the Washington Post. She has produced the only regularly-recurring science comedy shows in the United States since 2014. Before her time at the Washington Post, she was known as a digital storyteller for the NASA Earth Observatory.

Early life
Kasha Govind Patel was born in Fairmont, West Virginia. She is of Indian descent. Patel graduated from high school in 2008. In 2012, Patel obtained a bachelor's degree in chemistry from Wake Forest University. Before starting her comedy career, she also attended Boston University to study science journalism.

Career
Patel's comedy career began in 2014. She moved to Washington, District of Columbia in 2013.

In 2015, Patel published a study of the citizen science effort Aurorasaurus St. Patrick's Day Storm.

Patel performed at the 2018 American Association for the Advancement of Science conference where she also presented several topics for NASA. In 2018, Patel was featured as one of the top undiscovered comedians in the US.

Patel has also discussed her synthesis of science and comedy during a TEDx Tysons event.

References

External links
 

21st-century American comedians
American stand-up comedians
American women comedians
American comedians of Indian descent
American podcasters
Comedians from West Virginia
Wake Forest University alumni
Boston University College of Communication alumni
Living people
People from Fairmont, West Virginia
1991 births
21st-century American women
American women podcasters